Holthaus is a surname. Notable people with the surname include:

Eric Holthaus (born 1981), American meteorologist and climate journalist
Fabian Holthaus (born 1995), German footballer
Michael Holthaus (born 1950), German swimmer
Nico Holthaus (born 1971), American writer, musician, filmmaker, and professor